Dale Martin is an American electrician and politician currently serving in the Ohio Senate from Ohio's 21st district. He was appointed to the seat after incumbent Democrat Sandra Williams resigned to accept a job in the private sector. He was selected to replace Williams and was sworn in on June 7, 2022. Prior to being sworn into the Ohio State Senate, he worked as an electrician in the Cleveland area for 26 years.

References

Democratic Party Ohio state senators
21st-century American politicians
Living people
Year of birth missing (living people)